Yamana Beach ( is an ice-free beach extending ca.  on the west coast of Cape Shirreff in the north extremity of Ioannes Paulus II Peninsula, Livingston Island in Antarctica. It is surmounted by Toqui Hill on the east. The beach is part of Antarctic Specially Protected Area ASPA 149 Cape Shirreff and San Telmo Island. The area was visited by early 19th century sealers.

The name was given by scientific personnel of the Chilean Antarctic Institute in 1985, in connection with Daniel Torres Navarro who discovered the skull of a young indigenous Yamana woman. According to research, she was in her early 20s, and she might had died at around 1819 to 1825 on a sealing mission, making hers the oldest known human remains on Antarctic soil.

Location
Chilean mapping in 2004, Bulgarian in 2017.

Maps
 Map 3. Cape Shirreff, ASPA No. 149. Instituto Antártico Chileno, April 2004
 L. Ivanov. Antarctica: Livingston Island and Smith Island. Scale 1:100000 topographic map. Manfred Wörner Foundation, 2017
 Antarctic Digital Database (ADD). Scale 1:250000 topographic map of Antarctica. Scientific Committee on Antarctic Research (SCAR). Since 1993, regularly upgraded and updated

Sources

Beaches of Livingston Island
Yaghan